Vernon Allatt (born 28 May 1959) is an English former footballer who made more than 250 appearances in the Football League playing as a forward for Crewe Alexandra, Halifax Town, Preston North End, Rochdale and Stockport County.

References

1959 births
Living people
People from Cannock
Association football forwards
English footballers
Hednesford Town F.C. players
Halifax Town A.F.C. players
Rochdale A.F.C. players
Crewe Alexandra F.C. players
Preston North End F.C. players
Stockport County F.C. players
English Football League players